Białka may refer to the following places in Poland:
Białka, Krasnystaw County in Lublin Voivodeship (east Poland)
Białka, Łęczna County in Lublin Voivodeship (east Poland)
Białka, Parczew County in Lublin Voivodeship (east Poland)
Białka, Radzyń Podlaski County in Lublin Voivodeship (east Poland)
Białka, Subcarpathian Voivodeship (south-east Poland)
Białka, Lesser Poland Voivodeship (south Poland)
Białka, Gostynin County in Masovian Voivodeship (east-central Poland)
Białka, Radom County in Masovian Voivodeship (east-central Poland)
Białka, Gmina Łukta in Warmian-Masurian Voivodeship (north Poland)
Białka, Gmina Morąg in Warmian-Masurian Voivodeship (north Poland)
Białka, West Pomeranian Voivodeship (north-west Poland)
Białka Tatrzańska
Nowa Białka, Stara Białka, both in Kamienna Góra County, Lower Silesian Voivodeship (south-west Poland)
Rivers in Poland
Białka (Dunajec), tributary of the Dunajec
Białka (Kurówka), tributary of the Kurówka
Białka (Tyśmienica), tributary of the Tyśmienica (Wieprz)